Pekuri is a Finnish surname. Notable people with the surname include:

Joel Pekuri (1927–1991), Finnish diplomat
Lauri Pekuri (1916–1999), Finnish flying ace

Finnish-language surnames